Alan Tinsley (born in Fleetwood, Lancashire) is an English former professional football midfielder and non-league manager. He played in the Football League for Preston North End and Bury. His grandson Ryan Poole also played for Fleetwood Town FC and was an outstanding player, following in his grandad's footsteps.

Tinsley played for Preston North End, which he left to join Bury in August 1970. On leaving Bury in 1975, he joined Mossley. He later played for Fleetwood Town before joining Blackpool Wren Rovers.

Tinsley left Rovers to rejoin Mossley in October 1980, remaining with them until the end of the season. With Mossley he missed their FA Cup shock win at home to Football League side Crewe Alexandra, but did play in the second round tie which Mossley lost 3–1 at home to Mansfield Town. He played 94 times in his two spells with Mossley, scoring 7 times. After leaving Mossley, he re-signed for Fleetwood Town.

He later became manager of Fleetwood Town and in 1994 became manager of Lancaster City. He resigned in November 1996, but had a second spell in charge of Lancaster from 1998 to March 1999 when resigned with a complaint about the standard of refereeing.

References

Living people
Year of birth missing (living people)
English footballers
Preston North End F.C. players
Bury F.C. players
Mossley A.F.C. players
Fleetwood Town F.C. players
Fleetwood Town F.C. managers
Lancaster City F.C. managers
People from Fleetwood
Miami Toros players
English Football League players
North American Soccer League (1968–1984) players
Association football midfielders
Blackpool Wren Rovers F.C. players
English expatriate sportspeople in the United States
Expatriate soccer players in the United States
English expatriate footballers
English football managers